Communist Party of Russia might refer to:

 Russian Social Democratic Labour Party, founded in 1898 - the forerunner of the Communist Party of the Soviet Union
 Communist Party of the Soviet Union, formally established in 1912 and known variously as the Russian Communist Party and All-Union Communist Party (bolsheviks)
 Communist Party of the RSFSR, a short-lived (1990–1991) branch of the Communist Party of the Soviet Union
 Communist Party of the Russian Federation, formed in 1993 after the breakup of the Soviet Union
 Party of Narodnik Communists (September to November 1918), formed by a section of Left Socialist-Revolutionaries who wished to cooperate with the Bolsheviks
 Party of Revolutionary Communism (1918 to 1920), a party of Left Socialist-Revolutionaries dissidents
 Russian Communist Workers Party, established in 1991
 Communist Party of the Soviet Union (2001)
 Russian Communist Workers' Party of the Communist Party of the Soviet Union, established in 2001
 Communist Party "Communists of Russia", founded in 2009, registered in 2012